The following is an overview and list of the announcers and television networks to broadcast the National Invitation Basketball Tournament (or the NIT).

Early coverage by CBS
From 1966-1975, CBS provided national television coverage for selected games from the National Invitation Tournament. Before 1975, the NCAA only allowed one team per conference to play in the NCAA tournament. Therefore, the NIT got many top teams and was considered somewhat comparable in quality to the NCAA men's basketball tournament.

In the early part of this era (circa 1966-1968), CBS carried one game on the opening Saturday and the championship game the following Saturday. By 1969, CBS moved their first round coverage from Saturday to Sunday to avoid conflicting with the NCAA tournament regional finals coverage on NBC. In the process, the NIT title game went head-to-head with the NCAA consolation game. The same would be true on both counts for the next three years.

In 1973, CBS expanded their NIT coverage to four games. The March 17 game (Notre Dame-USC) went up against an NCAA regional final on NBC. Meanwhile, the March 24 game (Notre Dame-North Carolina) went up against the first NCAA Final Four game.

In 1974, CBS covered went from covering four to covering five games in the NIT. The March 16 doubleheader (Md E Shore-Manhattan and Purdue-North Carolina) went up against the NCAA regional finals on NBC. Meanwhile, the March 23 doubleheader (Purdue-Jacksonville and Utah-Boston College) went head-to-head against the NCAA Final Four.

In 1975, CBS did not cover any NIT games on the first weekend, but did carry the semifinals and finals. The March 22 doubleheader (Providence-St John's and Princeton-Oregon) went head-to-head with the NCAA regional finals.

ESPN's coverage

Radio
ESPN's 10-year contract not only gave ESPN the entire NIT on TV. It also gave ESPN Radio the rights to provide national radio broadcasts for the NIT during that 10-year span. When the NCAA acquired the NIT, the NIT radio rights became part of the NCAA Radio Network contract and moved over to Dial Global, which would rename themselves Westwood One in September 2013.

References

CBS Sports
ESPN College Basketball
ESPN2
ESPN Radio
Broadcasters
Lists of college basketball announcers in the United States
Nit